Aries (Latin for "ram") is the first astrological sign in the zodiac, spanning the first 30 degrees of celestial longitude (0°≤  <30°), and originates from the Aries constellation. Under the tropical zodiac, the Sun transits this sign from approximately March 21 to April 19 each year. This time duration is exactly the first month of the Solar Hijri calendar (Arabic Hamal/Persian Farvardin/Pashto Wray).

According to the tropical system of astrology, the Sun enters the sign of Aries when it reaches the March equinox, typically on March 21. Because the Earth takes approximately 365.24 days to go around the Sun, the precise time of the equinox is not the same each year, and generally will occur about six hours later from one year to the next until reset by a leap year. The leap day February 29 causes that year's March equinox to fall about eighteen hours earlier compared with the previous year.

Background 
Aries is one of the six positive signs of the zodiac and its modality is cardinal. Aries is one of the three fire signs in the zodiac, along with Leo and Sagittarius. The ruling planet is Mars. Individuals born while the Sun is in this sign may be called Ariens The color for Aries is red.

The equivalent in the Hindu solar calendar is Meṣa.

Mythology 
In Greek Mythology, the symbol of the ram is based on the Chrysomallus, the flying ram that rescued Phrixus and Helle, the children of the Boeotian king Athamas and provided the Golden Fleece. Aries is derived from the God of War, Ares. He is described as, "murderous, bloodthirsty, the incarnate curse of mortals; and, strangely, a coward". The Roman name for Ares was Mars, which is the ruling planet of the sign.

Gallery

See also

Astronomical symbols
Chinese zodiac
Circle of stars
Cusp (astrology)
Elements of the zodiac
History of astrology

References

Citations

Sources 

 For time of Sun's entry or exit from a sign, calculate Longitude of Sun, apparent geocentric ecliptic of date, interpolated to find time of crossing 0°, 30°..... For list of vernal equinox dates calculate phenomena: solstices/equinoxes, choosing UT1 and years 1800 through 2050.

External links

 Warburg Institute Iconographic Database (over 300 medieval and early modern images of Aries) 

Fictional sheep
Western astrological signs
Mythological caprids